Serra d'Irta Natural Park is a natural park in Valencian Community), Southern Spain. It contains 7,744 hectares of land, as well as a shoreline of marine nature reserve of the adjacent Mediterranean Sea. It was declared a protected area in 2002.

The park protects the environment of large zones of the Serra d'Irta mountain range with the highest elevation being the pico Campanilles (or Campanella) at 572 metres, and the coastal area of the Costa del Azahar with the reefs of the marine reserve extending into the sea. The range runs parallel to the coast and forks in the south in an area separated by the Estopet valley. On the coastal side the mountains descend abruptly along 12 km with numerous cliffs, coves and cornices.
 
Large swathes of urbanized and touristic areas of the coastal side of Serra d'Irta located at the northern end near Peníscola, as well as at the southern end, near Alcossebre, are not included in the Park.

See also
Natural park (Spain)

References

External links
Natural Park of Sierra de Irta
Natural Parks of the Valencian Community (English, Spanish, Valencian)

Natural parks of Spain
Natural parks of the Valencian Community
Marine reserves of Spain
Protected areas of the Valencian Community